Easy Rock is an adult contemporary music radio brand of Manila Broadcasting Company (MBC). Its main studios are located in Star City Complex, Pasay, Metro Manila. Its flagship station is DWRK in Metro Manila, with seven regional stations located throughout the Philippines either owned by MBC or its sister companies within the company's media group.

History

The Easy Rock Network was formed on May 18, 2009. The formation of the Easy Rock Network started with an initial rebrand of the newly acquired DWRK radio station, which MBC bought from the ACWS-United Broadcasting Network on October 6, 2008.  The Easy Rock network was later expanded by rebranding a number of former Yes FM stations, Love Radio and Hot FM stations to Easy Rock.

The format of Easy Rock resembles that of WRocK, with "no/minimal talk, less commercials and more music". But while most of the regional stations maintained its traditional format, the Manila station slowly shifted to Mainstream AC with its playlist being more identical to that of sister stations Love Radio and Yes The Best.

Easy Rock stations

Easy Rock is also broadcast to 11 provincial stations in the Philippines

See also
Manila Broadcasting Company

References

 
Philippine radio networks
Companies based in Pasay